George Innes Llewelyn Lloyd (24 December 1925 – 23 August 1991) was a Welsh television producer.  He had a long career in BBC drama, which included producing series such as Doctor Who and Talking Heads.

Early life and career

Following service in the Royal Navy, Innes Lloyd trained as an actor at the Central School of Speech and Drama. He joined the BBC in the 1950s, initially in presentation before moving into outside broadcasts. As an outside broadcast producer he covered many important sporting events such as tennis at Wimbledon, golf and motor racing. He also produced important national events such as the Royal Christmas Message and Winston Churchill's state funeral.

Doctor Who

Lloyd began his drama career when he was made the producer of the science fiction series Doctor Who in 1966. He was the third producer on the programme and his duration as producer ran for two seasons between The Celestial Toymaker and The Enemy of the World (with the exception of The Tomb of the Cybermen, which was produced by Peter Bryant as a test piece to show that he could take over from Lloyd).

Lloyd made the series more action-orientated and less whimsical than it had been previously, which he had regarded as old-fashioned. He attempted to make the show more realistic, to this end hiring Kit Pedler as an unofficial scientific advisor.

During his tenure as producer the concept of regeneration was introduced, whereby the lead actor in the programme might be replaced. This arose following continuing health difficulties with William Hartnell as the lead actor. Lloyd and story editor Gerry Davis came up with an intriguing way of writing the Doctor out – as he was an alien being, they decided that he would have the power to change his body when it became worn out or seriously injured. Whereas John Wiles, the previous producer to Lloyd, had intended to replace Hartnell with another actor but playing the same character, Lloyd and Davis elected to change the entire personality and appearance of the Doctor. They eventually cast character actor Patrick Troughton, having previously considered another actor, Peter Jeffrey, as well as Peter Cushing, who had played Dr. Who in two Dr. Who movies. Troughton first appeared in November 1966 after the changeover from Hartnell had been seen at the end of the story The Tenth Planet.

Lloyd's era as producer of Doctor Who became known as a monster era. It saw the introduction of recurring monsters such as the Cybermen, the Ice Warriors and the Yeti. He also terminated the purely historical stories prominent in the first three seasons of classic Doctor Who.

Other work
Innes Lloyd also worked on Thirty-Minute Theatre, the football soap United! and Dead of Night, but he is best remembered as the producer of more prestigious drama. As a BBC drama producer in the 1970s and 1980s, his chosen projects were often biographical. Collaborating with authors such as Roger Milner and Don Shaw, he brought to the screen biographies from a diverse range of, often flawed, heroes ranging from Orde Wingate and Arthur "Bomber" Harris, the Campbells Donald and Malcolm, through to the first Director General of the BBC John Reith. He also explored notions of Englishness in the twentieth century with productions such as England, Their England (directed by Stephen Frears), East of Ipswich (written by Michael Palin) and An Englishman's Castle (1978) starring Kenneth More; a dystopian vision of the consequence of losing the second world war. He was a frequent collaborator with Alan Bennett. That relationship started in 1972 with Bennett's poignant comedy A Day Out and continued through landmark productions such as the first series of Talking Heads until Lloyd's death in 1991. Bennett's An Englishman Abroad told the remarkable true story of the chance meeting between actress Coral Browne (playing herself) and spy Guy Burgess (Alan Bates) in Moscow in 1958, while A Question of Attribution (finished shortly before Lloyd's death) was a logical sequel, showing the radically different fate of Surveyor of the Queen's Pictures and fellow traitor Anthony Blunt.

Personal life and death
Innes was one of his two middle names as well as his mother's maiden name. Lloyd died of cancer on 23 August 1991, aged 65.

References

External links
 

1925 births
1991 deaths
BBC television producers
People from Conwy County Borough
Welsh television producers